was a town located in Sakata District, Shiga Prefecture, Japan. There was Kashiwabara-juku in Edo period.

As of 2003, the town had an estimated population of 13,393 and a density of 252.17 persons per km2. The total area was 53.11 km2.

On February 14, 2005, Santō, along with the towns of Maihara and Ibuki (all from Sakata District), was merged to create the city of Maibara.

Dissolved municipalities of Shiga Prefecture
Maibara, Shiga